Malavika Mohanan (born 4 August 1993) is an Indian actress who works predominantly in Tamil and Malayalam films. The daughter of cinematographer K. U. Mohanan, she made her acting debut in the Malayalam film Pattam Pole (2013). She gained praise for her starring role in Majid Majidi's Hindi film Beyond the Clouds (2017). She has since played the leading lady in the Malayalam thriller film The Great Father (2017), and the Tamil action films Petta (2019) and Master (2021).

Early life
Malavika Mohanan was born 4 August 1993 and is the daughter of cinematographer K. U. Mohanan. She was born  in the town of Payyanur in Kannur district of Kerala and grew up in Mumbai.

Career

2013–2017: Early work
Malavika completed a degree in Mass Media at Wilson College, Mumbai, hoping to emulate her father as a cinematographer or as a director. Post her graduation, while she was contemplating taking up higher studies, she accompanied her father to a commercial shoot for a fairness cream, starring veteran Malayalam actor Mammootty. The actor subsequently enquired about Malavika's interest in acting, before offering her a role opposite his son, Dulquer Salmaan, in an upcoming Malayalam film.  She took time to consider the proposal before passing an audition and accepting terms to star in Pattam Pole (2013), and gradually learned about the process of acting as the shoot progressed. Owing to the original costume designer's illness, she also worked as her own designer for the project. The romantic drama film, which narrated the relationship between a Tamil Brahmin youth and a Christian girl, received mixed reviews and did not perform well at the box office. A critic from Rediff.com noted that Malavika's "peppy girl act is far from being perfect but shows promise", while the Times of India's reviewers suggested that she did a "decent job". During the period, she continued having an interest in fashion, setting up an Indian ethnic fusion fashion blog called "The Scarlet Window".

In her second film, Nirnayakam (2015), she portrayed as a ballet dancer, won good reviews but also met with a tepid response commercially. Another film during the period, Naale opposite Fahadh Faasil, saw her portray a tribal girl but was later dropped midway through production. In 2016, Mohanan worked on her first Kannada film, Naanu Mattu Varalakshmi (2016) opposite a debutant actor, Prithvi. Despite having a low-key release at the box office, the film won good reviews with Malavika's portrayal of the titular role of Varalakshmi being praised by critics. She then featured in the role of a police officer in the crime thriller The Great Father (2017), where she starred alongside an ensemble cast including Mammootty, Arya and Sneha. The film opened to positive reviews and performed well at the box office.

2017–present: Beyond the Clouds and beyond
Malavika's breakthrough as an actress came through her role as Tara, a poor girl from Mumbai's Dhobi Ghat area, in Majid Majidi's drama film, Beyond the Clouds (2017). Following her successful audition, Majidi selected her ahead of renowned actresses Deepika Padukone and Kangana Ranaut for the role, which saw her portray the older sister of debutant Ishaan Khatter. She expressed her delight at working with Majidi so early in her career, especially considering that she regularly had to study and write essays on his films during her undergraduate course. For the film, she lost eight kilograms in fifteen days to film for a jail sequence, and opted not to wash her hair for several days on end to get the look of the slum dweller correct. The film was screened across several international festivals, before being released worldwide in April 2018. Malavika won positive reviews for her portrayal, with Filmfare's critic stating "Malavika Mohanan is a natural in front of the camera". A reviewer from The Times of India stated she was "captivating in her honest portrayal" and "skilfully walks the fine line between passionate and melodramatic", while The Hollywood Reporter called her "solid".

In mid-2018, she signed on to appear in a role in Karthik Subbaraj's Petta (2019), which would feature her alongside an ensemble cast including Rajinikanth, Vijay Sethupathi and Nawazuddin Siddiqui. For the film, which marked her first project in the Tamil language, Malavika hired a Tamil-speaking tutor to help her practice her lines. She then went on to appear in the Tamil action thriller film Master (2021) alongside Vijay, in which she played the role of Charulatha, a college lecturer. The film was a huge commercial success, and became the highest-grossing film in her career.

In 2022, her first release was Maaran, opposite Dhanush. The film opt a theatrical release, with released via directly on  Disney+Hotstar, with received negative reviews from critics and audience. She is currently shootings for her upcoming Hindi film Yudhra opposite Siddhant Chaturvedi. The latter is scheduled to release in Summer 2022.

Filmography

Film

Web series

Music videos

Awards and nominations

References

External links 

1993 births
21st-century Indian actresses
Actresses from Kerala
Actresses in Malayalam cinema
Actresses in Kannada cinema
Actresses in Hindi cinema
Actresses in Tamil cinema
Indian film actresses
Living people
People from Kannur district
Actresses from Mumbai